Matthews Cottage is a heritage-listed cottage at Kiandra in the Kosciuszko National Park, Snowy Valleys Council, New South Wales, Australia. The property is owned by the Office of Environment and Heritage, an agency of the Government of New South Wales. It was added to the New South Wales State Heritage Register on 2 April 1999.

History 
The site of Matthews' Cottage, Lot 4, Section 12 of Kiandra, was initially sold at an auction of Crown land to George Venterman on 29 June 1874. George, who is recorded as a "miner of Kiandra" paid the sum of 20 shillings 3 pence for the land. In March 1879 the land was sold to Frederick Blaxland of Binjura, and subsequently to William John Foley of Kiandra.

"Bill" Foley was born at Goulburn Jail in 1879, the son of a warden. This work often proved to be exciting to the young Bill, particularly as the coach frequently carried gold for the banks. At these times a gold escort of six to eight armed men would accompany the coach. His departure from Myrtleford was by pushbike; he rode all the way to Grahamstown, near , for his wedding with Jenny Bradley. During 1900 the Foleys moved to Kiandra where Bill found work at Oliver Harris' store. Work comprised the butchering of livestock and subsequent transportation of the meat by packhorses to miners at Lobbs Hole.

Photographic evidence indicates that the original cottage was constructed by the Foleys at some time between 1900 and 1906.

Description 
The Cottage was a simple three-roomed building with a verandah facing the street. Construction was of weatherboards with a corrugated iron gable roof and the interior was lined with timber boards. The construction utilised modern techniques and materials, due to the technology available within a typical rural town at the time and the easy access to major centres via reasonable roads.

The builder is not known. It is likely that the sawn timber framing would have been obtained from one of the local sawmills such as Alpine Creek. Lining boards, windows and doors are likely to have been obtained from outside the region. The use of basalt stonework in the fireplace is relatively uncommon, although the Kiandra Courthouse and Police Lockup were constructed entirely of basalt.

Heritage listing 
Matthews Cottage was listed on the New South Wales State Heritage Register on 2 April 1999.

See also

References

Bibliography

Attribution 

New South Wales State Heritage Register
Kosciuszko National Park
Snowy Monaro Regional Council
Houses in New South Wales
Articles incorporating text from the New South Wales State Heritage Register